Benjamin Lyle West (born December 20, 1976) is a former professional American football safety in the National Football League (NFL). He played four seasons for the New York Giants (1999–2000) and the Kansas City Chiefs (2002–2003)

West played for the Huskies at Washington High School, graduating in 1995. He went on to play at Chabot College and San Jose State University.

Since 2004, he has been working as a realtor in the Greater Sacramento Area.

References

1976 births
Living people
Players of American football from Columbus, Georgia
American football safeties
San Jose State Spartans football players
New York Giants players
Kansas City Chiefs players
Chabot Gladiators football players